The  Edmonton Eskimos season was the 56th season for the team in the Canadian Football League and their 65th overall. The Eskimos finished the season in 4th place in the West Division with a 4–14 record and failed to make the playoffs.

Offseason

CFL Draft
The 2013 CFL Draft took place on May 6, 2013. The Eskimos had seven selections in the seven-round draft after trading their first round pick to Montreal for Brody McKnight and acquiring additional third and fourth round picks.

Notable transactions 

*Later traded to the Hamilton Tiger-Cats
**Later traded to the Saskatchewan Roughriders
***Later traded back to the Saskatchewan Roughriders

Preseason

Regular season

Season standings

Season schedule

Total attendance: 288,863 
Average attendance: 32,096 (57.0%, capacity 56,302)

Team

Roster

Coaching staff

References

Edmon
Edmonton Elks seasons